This article provides information on candidates who stood for the 1964 Australian Senate election. The election was held on 5 December 1964.

Retiring senators

Labor
Senator Stan Amour  (NSW)
Senator James Arnold (NSW)
Senator Bill Aylett (Tas)
Senator Gordon Brown (Qld)

Liberal
Senator Roy Kendall (Qld)

Country
Senator Ted Maher (Qld)

Senate
Sitting senators are shown in bold text. Tickets that elected at least one senator are highlighted in the relevant colour. Successful candidates are identified by an asterisk (*).

New South Wales
Five seats were up for election. The Labor Party was defending three seats. The Liberal-Country Coalition was defending two seats. Senators Joe Fitzgerald (Labor), Doug McClelland (Labor), Colin McKellar (Country), Lionel Murphy (Labor) and Sir William Spooner (Liberal) were not up for re-election.

Queensland
Five seats were up for election. The Labor Party was defending two seats. The Liberal-Country Coalition was defending three seats. Senators Archie Benn (Labor), Sir Walter Cooper (Country), Kenneth Morris (Liberal), Dame Annabelle Rankin (Liberal) and Bob Sherrington (Liberal) were not up for re-election.

South Australia
Five seats were up for election. The Labor Party was defending three seats. The Liberal Party was defending two seats. Senators Reg Bishop (Labor), Jim Cavanagh (Labor), Clive Hannaford (Liberal), Ted Mattner (Liberal) and Theo Nicholls (Labor) were not up for re-election.

Tasmania
Five seats were up for election. The Labor Party was defending two seats. The Liberal Party was defending two seats. The Democratic Labor Party was defending one seat. Senators Denham Henty (Liberal), Nick McKenna (Labor), Bob Poke (Labor), Reg Turnbull (Independent) and Reg Wright (Liberal) were not up for re-election.

Victoria
Five seats were up for election. The Labor Party was defending two seats. The Liberal Party was defending three seats. Senators Marie Breen (Liberal), Sam Cohen (Labor), Magnus Cormack (Liberal), Charles Sandford (Labor) and Harrie Wade (Country) were not up for re-election.

Western Australia

Five seats were up for election. The Labor Party was defending two seats. The Liberal Party was defending two seats. The Country Party was defending one seat. Senators Shane Paltridge (Liberal), Edgar Prowse (Country), Dorothy Tangney (Labor), Seddon Vincent (Liberal) and Don Willesee (Labor) were not up for re-election.

Summary by party 

Beside each party is an indication of whether the party contested the Senate election in each state.

See also
 1964 Australian Senate election
 Members of the Australian Senate, 1962–1965
 Members of the Australian Senate, 1965–1968
 List of political parties in Australia

References
Adam Carr's Election Archive - Senate 1964

1964 in Australia
Candidates for Australian federal elections